Time in Comoros is given by a single time zone, officially denoted as East Africa Time (EAT; UTC+03:00). Comoros does not observe daylight saving time.

IANA time zone database 
In the IANA time zone database, Comoros is given one zone in the file zone.tab – Indian/Comoro, which is an alias to Africa/Nairobi. "KM" refers to the country's ISO 3166-1 alpha-2 country code. Data for Comoros directly from zone.tab of the IANA time zone database; columns marked with * are the columns from zone.tab itself:

See also 
Time in Africa
List of time zones by country
List of UTC time offsets

References

External links 
Current time in Comoros at Time.is
Time in Comoros at TimeAndDate.com

Geography of the Comoros
Time by country
Time in Africa